Konstantin Kakanias (born September 18, 1961 in Athens) is a contemporary Greek painter and multimedia artist. He currently lives and works in Los Angeles and Greece. Throughout his career Kakanias has created drawings, paintings, sculptures, performances, ceramics and books.

Kakanias' work does not belong to any single style. He is known to explore a range of themes in his work from the light and comic to the dark and psychological

Career

Kakanias attended the Fashion Institute of Technology in New York City, majoring in Textile Design,  from 1977-1979.
Kakanias moved to Paris in 1979. He attended the Studio Berçot where he studied Fashion and Art. He was also taught by the Italian artist and stage designer Lila de Nobili. Kakanias started his career at 22, working as an illustrator for newspapers and magazines such as French Vogue and Vogue Italia. He created textile designs for Yves Saint Laurent and Christian Lacroix.

1984, Kakanias moved to Luxor, Egypt to study Ancient Egyptian art and remained there for a year. His art has been influenced by this experience.  "Echoes of pharaohs and hieroglyphs reverberate in many of Kakanias' drawings today."

New York
In 1988, Kakanias moved back to New York City where he collaborated with Tiffany and Barneys New York. His drawings were published by The New York Times and Vanity Fair. In 1991 he dedicated himself completely to making art. In 1995 he had a breakthrough exhibition  "No More Stains"  at the Postmasters Gallery in New York with sculptures and a performance.

In 1996 Kakanias introduced his fictional heroine Mrs.Tependris for an illustrated New York Times Magazine article. Mrs. Tependris, Kakanias' "alter-ego," is a caricature of an art collector and a high society doyenne who Kakanias uses as "a metaphor for the state of contemporary art and its superficial reception by the public". Mrs. Tependris has become a cult figure in the art community.  In 1997 he created his first book Freedom or Death based on the adventures of Mrs. Tependris.

Los Angeles
Kakanias moved to Los Angeles in 1997. For several years he continued working on the adventures of Mrs. Tependris and in 2002 published  In 2004 Kakanias was commissioned by the Greek Ministry of Culture to create a book for the 2004 Summer Olympics in Athens.

Kakanias has exhibited around the world in museums and galleries, notably "Time Goes By So Slowly" at the Goulandris Museum of Cycladic Art in 2006 and "A Tribute to Antonis Benakis" at the Benaki Museum in 2004-5. In 2008 he collaborated with Diane von Fürstenberg to create the comic book  (DC Comics 2008). He has done numerous private commissions. In 2004 Kakanias frescoed a church in Spain for Carolina Herrera Jr.

Publications

Exhibitions
Thirty Nine (Anna Wintour Glasses), Rebecca Camhi Gallery, 2012

References

External links 
Rebecca Camhi Gallery
 Hunter Drohojowska-Philp, “Meet the Artist’s Very Good . . Er, Friend.” ,  September 3 2000 , Calendar , Los Angeles Times
 Alexandra Koroxenidis, “Putting oneself in the picture: The life of a fictional art collector“  Monday May 20 2002 , Kathimerini-Herald Tribune English edition
  Alexandra Koroxenidis, “ A cult figure’s latest adventures “  Monday April 5 2004 , Kathimerini-Herald Tribune English edition
Volandes Stellene "Olympic Talent" Departures Magazine Jul/Aug-2004
 Alexandra Koroxenidis, “ Cutout figures and motifs create a sculptural ensemble “  Monday January 3 2006 , Kathimerini-Herald Tribune English edition
 YouTube: Konstantin Kakanias show "Pearl's Dreams", Lightbox Gallery, Los Angeles, 2006
Irina Aleksander, “Diane von Furstenberg Channels Her Inner Wonder Woman, But Do Superheroes 'Work' In Fashion?“  October 7, 2008 , The Observer
Christos Paridis, “Religion Should Be Like Sex“  2009 , 10percent.gr

1961 births
Greek contemporary artists
Postmodern artists
Living people
Artists from Athens
Artists from New York City
Artists from Los Angeles